John James Fox (born 1980 in Liverpool) is an English director of music videos.

Career 
After studying film, at the University of Wolverhampton, Fox started out screenwriting for film production companies including the 30 minute Drama "Bright". From 2003 he has directed several award-winning short films, including "The Third Season", which was a runner up in the Short Cutters Short Film Of The Year Award. His short film "The World Of Big Ideas" has been shown on several satellite channels and BBC Big Screen throughout various cities in the UK. His short films have appeared at The Edinburgh International Festival. Since 2006, he has directed a number of music videos for various artists including Abigail Hopkins (daughter to Sir Anthony Hopkins) and Laika Dog (fronted by Tony Wright formerly of the popular band Terrorvision). His videos are often known for their unique style and originality. Fox has directed two music videos for The Indigo Road Featuring Heidi Jo Hines, daughter of Wings (band) guitarist Denny Laine.

Fox was a sponsor of The Glasswerk 2007 New Music Awards.

Selected videography
2009
 Indigo Road - "Up For Air"
 Indigo Road - "Hey Its Alright"

2008
 The Meds Collective - "Let Me Tell You"
 Nephu Huzzband - (Documentary)
 The Indigo Road - "Simple"
 The Indigo Road - "Goodbye To You"
 Ebenus - "After Party"
 Marsha Swanson - "How Are You?"

2007
 The Cutters - "Saviour"
 Laika Dog - "Monkey Song"
 Abigail Hopkins - "I'll Be Waiting For You By The Bus Stand"
 Andy Cornfoot - "Miles Away"

2006
 Creo K - "Dead Picnic"
 Creo K - "Adhesive"
 FM Films Ltd - "The World Of Big Ideas" (short)
 FM Films Ltd - "Unsigned: Go For It!" (short)

2005
 FM Films Ltd - "The Third Season" (short)
 FM Films Ltd - "The Runner" (short)
 FM Films Ltd - "Fuel Crisis" (short)

2004
 FM Films - "Motion Picture: Part 2" (short)
 FM Films - "Motion Picture" (short)

2003
 Paul Fox - "Debonair"
 First-Take Productions Ltd - "Bright" (screenplay / short)

References 
The Glasswerk 2007 New Music Awards news article by Alex Machorton.

Whats On Music & Gigs Evening Gazette article by Andrew Pain.

Pure Rawk News article by Nicola Crichton.

External links 
 Hull Film Festival Film Festival Guide.
 Official Website Contains films of his music videos and other short films.
 Edinburgh International Festival short film catalogue.

English music video directors
English screenwriters
English male screenwriters
Advertising directors
Film people from Liverpool
Alumni of the University of Wolverhampton
1980 births
Living people